Santhosh T. Kuruvilla is an Indian Film producer who has funded films in the Malayalam and Tamil Film Industries. He is the Managing Director of Moonshot Entertainments and Chairman of OPM Dream Mills Cinemas. He also owns a chain of business enterprises based on India and UAE.

Career 
Kuruvilla began a chain of restaurants under ‘GudFud’ and ‘Gusto Food’. He is also one among the directors of the cafe ‘Donut Factory’

Kuruvilla is the Executive Director and General Manager of Horeitia Global, a construction company in Qatar. He is also the director of Techno Steel, a steel fabrication unit based in Dubai. Besides these roles, he is also the managing director of a music and art initiative in Doha, named Music Lounge and the chairman of an Indian software consultancy named Techno Valley.

Filmography

References

External links 
 

1971 births
Living people
Indian businesspeople
Indian film producers